Grevillea scabra, commonly known as the rough-leaved grevillea,<ref name=FB>{{FloraBase|name=Grevillea scabra|id=2089}}</ref> is a species of flowering plant in the family Proteaceae and is endemic to the south-west of Western Australia. It is a low, open shrub with clusters of narrowly elliptic to more or less linear leaves and small clusters of white to cream-coloured flowers.

The upper surface of the leaves is glabrous and the edges are rolled under obscuring most of the lower surface. The style has a conspicuous appendage that is C-shaped in side view.

TaxonomyGrevillea scabra was first formally described by the botanist Carl Meissner in 1845 in Lehmann's Plantae Preissianae from specimens collected by James Drummond in the Swan River Colony. The specific epithet (scabra'') means "rough", referring to the surface of the leaves.

Distribution
Rough-leaved grevillea grows in open forest or woodland, usually in soils containing laterite and is found in the area between York, Bolgart and Goomalling in the Avon Wheatbelt and Jarrah Forest bioregions of south-western Western Australia.

See also
 List of Grevillea species

References

scabra
Endemic flora of Western Australia
Eudicots of Western Australia
Proteales of Australia
Taxa named by Carl Meissner
Plants described in 1845